Liang Bua is a limestone cave on the island of Flores, Indonesia, slightly north of the town of Ruteng in Manggarai Regency, East Nusa Tenggara. The cave demonstrated archaeological and paleontological potential in the 1950s and 1960s as described by the Dutch missionary and archaeologist Theodor L. Verhoeven. 

In September 2003, an Indonesian field team and its coordinator of the excavation team, Thomas Sutikna, uncovered the first indications of a skull. Initially, the archeologists only analyzed the top of the cranium and due to the small size believed that the skull belonged to a small child. However, Sutikna and his colleagues soon discovered that its teeth were permanent and mature, revealing that it actually belonged to a fully grown adult. After a few weeks, the team had discovered most of this particular hominid's skeleton and later was coded LB1, LB2, etc., after the name of the cave. This skeleton later became the holotype specimen of Homo floresiensis, also known as the "hobbit." Despite the small stature and brain size, Homo floresiensis was capable of using stone tools, hunting animals such as small elephants and rodents, and dealing with many predators such as large komodo dragons. As of 2022, excavations are still being conducted and additional findings such as teeth are being discovered and analyzed.

There has been much debate whether the skeletal remains are actually Homo floresiensis due to the small nature of these specimens. As of 2022, further research and studies are still being conducted to confirm whether these discoveries are Homo floresiensis.

History of discoveries 
Theodor L. Verhoeven, a Dutch missionary and archaeologist, was living in Flores in the 1950s and 60s. Verhoeven had been a keen student of archeology at the University of Utrecht. During this time, he worked at a Catholic seminary and in his free time would explore many archeological sites and perform many excavations in Flores. He discovered stone tools and suspected that Homo erectus from Java had made these. However, Verhoeven's work was not acknowledged by many paleoanthropologists at this time. After 30 years, an Indonesian-Dutch excavation team discovered new evidence that suggest that Verhoeven's predictions were correct.

In 2001, an Indonesian-Australian team began excavations in Liang Bua. Their goal was to excavate deeper into the cave hoping to see if modern or pre-modern humans were using Liang Bua. They were led by Indonesian field coordinator, Thomas Sutikna.

In 2003, Benyamin Tarus, a locally hired worker, was excavating a 2 by 2 meter square and found the first indication of a skull at a depth of 6 meters. At that point, many archeologists stepped in to help carefully remove sediment from the top of the skull. Rokus Due Awe, an Indonesian faunal expert, was called in to help inspect the excavated top portion of the skull. By looking at just the top of the skull, Awe believed it belonged to a small child due to the small size of the cranium. However, after several days of excavating, more of the cranium and mandible became exposed. This allowed Awe to further analyze the age and condition of the skull. They discovered that its teeth were permanent, revealing that this skull actually belonged to an adult. The team had discovered most of this particular hominid's skeleton and many stone tools that they may have created and used. They were later was coded LB1, LB2, etc., after the name of the cave.

Peter Brown, an expert on cranial, mandibular, and dental anatomy of early and modern humans, was asked to help identify and analyze this new discovery. The skeletal evidence indicates that the adults of these species weighed around 66 to 86 pounds, had an average height of 106 cm (3'6") tall, and had very small brains (400 ml). Brown concluded that the proportions between the humerus and femur were very similar to the proportions in Australopithecus and Homo habilis.  The characteristics of this skeleton appeared more similar to those of early hominins like Australopithecus afarensis than to those of modern humans. This skeleton later became the holotype specimen of Homo floresiensis.

The key specimens that many researchers focus on are LB1 and LB6. LB1 was discovered unfossilized in September 2003 and consisted of an almost complete skull and partial skeleton. Scientists assume that LB1 was a female of about 30 years old, about one metre tall, had a brain volume of about 380 to 420 ml, and weighed approximately 55 pounds.  On the other hand, LB6 consisted of a partial skeleton that appeared shorter than LB1 and its jaw was significantly different as it was more V- shaped. Scientists assume that LB6 was a child and was approximately five years old.

In 2004 Kira Westaway, a paleoanthropologist at the University of Wollongong, analyzed a thick blanket of sediment that the fossils were found in and discovered that these bones ranged from 18,000 to 38,000 years old. This suggests that these species at Liang Bua were alive during modern times and could have possibly shared this island with modern humans for approximately 30,000 years.

Further research and findings 
In 2010 and 2011, archaeologists discovered two hominin teeth in the cave that did not come from Homo floresiensis. According to Sutikna, the teeth date to around 46,000 BP and Sutkina and his team speculate that the teeth are likely to have come from Homo sapiens. Sutikna proposed that Homo sapiens could have coexisted with the "hobbits" for thousands of years and he also proposed that Homo sapiens could have led to the extinction of Homo floresiensis. However, there is no evidence to indicate that and as of 2016 research was still being conducted to prove his hypothesis.

In 2013, a 3D model of the cave created via laser scanning was made available online by the Smithsonian Institution.

In 2016, scientists discovered a lower jaw and teeth from at least one adult and potentially two children in Mata Menge, about 70 km east of Liang Bua. These findings are dated to about 700,000 years BP and could possibly be an early form of Homo floresiensis. Additionally in 2016, Sutikna, Smithsonian researcher Matt Tocheri, and other researchers announced that they concluded that the skeletal remains at Liang Bua became extinct around 50,000 years ago, much earlier than many researchers had originally thought. In addition, archaeologists discovered stone tools in the cave that were used from 190,000 to 50,000 years BP.

Disagreement
There is continuing disagreement among scientists as to whether the discoveries represent a new and distinct hominid species. The disagreement stems from the abnormal size of the skeletal remains found in Liang Bua. At the time, many of the skeletal remains found before were significantly larger. As a result, many researchers doubted the skeletal remains found were actually a new hominid species.

There are many different theories that researchers have created when trying to explain that the skeletal remains found do not represent a new hominid species. Many believe that it is more likely that the bones of the most complete individual found in Liang Bua (individual LB1) are those of a local person who was possibly suffering from a medical condition or a developmental disorder (perhaps Down syndrome) rather than a unique species of Homo that lived in Flores. LB1 had a small cranial volume, reported as approximately only 380 ml, about one third less than the average modern human. LB1 has very distinct short thighbones, which is a characteristic seen in those with Down syndrome. Robert B Eckhardt, professor of developmental genetics and evolution at Penn State, and his team suggest that the small cranial volume and short thighbones are consistent with a Down syndrome diagnosis. These sizes fall within those for a modern human with Down syndrome from the same geographic region. These characteristics are only present in LB1 and not in the other skeletal remains found in Liang Bua. Dr. Eckhardt believes that this is only further evidence that LB1 had Down syndrome due to its abnormality.

Another theory that researchers in 2011 suggested was that the species found in Liang Bua actually suffered from microcephaly, a condition where a baby's head is much smaller than expected. To test this, Ralph Holloway, an anthropologist at Columbia University, used MRI. Holloway and his team discovered that the skeletal remains found in Liang Bua did not fall within the range for microcephalic humans. They concluded that the skeletal remains found in Liang Bua most likely did not suffer from microcephaly and the findings are most likely a new and distinct hominid species. Holloway believed the reason for their small brain was that this was organized differently and thus only needing a smaller volume. However, many researchers disagree with Holloway's conclusion believing that there were many confounding variables that were not taken into account when testing for microcephaly in these fossils. Dean Falk, an anthropologist at Florida State University in Tallahassee, critiques Holloway's conclusion believing that Holloway's endocast (a 3D representation of the space within a cavity) was mis-shaped by the cracks and chips present in the ancient fossil head. Falk previously conducted a computed tomography (CT) scan of the Homo floresiensis skull and found that the skeletal evidence found is likely to be a separate species.

One theory during this time was that Homo erectus moved to Flores and over time their brains began to decrease in size due to island dwarfism, an evolutionary phenomenon whereby body size decreases significantly over time. However, opponents of this theory argue that Homo erectus's brain would not be able to shrink in relation to its body.

Even so, there are still many researchers that argue that the discoveries in Liang Bua represent a new distinct species that lived in relatively modern times. Sutikna, Smithsonian researcher Matt Tocheri, and other researchers announced that they conclude that the geological dating at Liang Bua became extinct around 50,000 years ago, which would be 10,000 years before Homo sapiens arrived in the region.

Palaeofauna 
 Homo floresiensis
 Stegodon florensis insularis, dwarfed stegodontid proboscidean
 Papagomys theodorverhoeveni, giant rat
 Papagomys armandvillei, giant rat
 Varanus komodoensis, giant varanid lizard
 Leptoptilos robustus, giant marabou stork

References

Further reading
 Brown, P.; Sutikna, T., Morwood, M. J., Soejono, R. P., Jatmiko, Wayhu Saptomo, E. & Rokus Awe Due (October 27, 2004). "A new small-bodied hominin from the Late Pleistocene of Flores, Indonesia.". Nature, 431. .
 
 Morwood, M. J.; Soejono, R. P., Roberts, R. G., Sutikna, T., Turney, C. S. M., Westaway, K. E., Rink, W. J., Zhao, J.- X., van den Bergh, G. D., Rokus Awe Due, Hobbs, D. R., Moore, M. W., Bird, M. I. & Fifield, L. K. (October 27, 2004). "Archaeology and age of a new hominin from Flores in eastern Indonesia.". Nature 431: 1087–1091. .
 
 Knepper, Gert M. (2019): Floresmens - Het leven van Theo Verhoeven, missionaris en archeoloog.  (Boekscout, Soest, The Netherlands) (= Verhoeven's biography, in Dutch)

Archaeological sites in Indonesia
Cenozoic paleontological sites of Asia
Caves of Indonesia
Paleoanthropological sites
Landforms of Flores Island (Indonesia)
Prehistoric Indonesia